Modon may refer to:
 The name given by the Venetians to the town of Methoni, Messenia, in Greece
 Latin Bishopric of Modon, a titular diocese of the Roman Catholic church whose seat was Methoni
 MODON, a business name of the Saudi Industrial Property Authority
 , a tributary of the Cher, in France
Modon (fluid dynamics), or dipole eddy pair.